Dinah is a biblical character.

Dinah may also refer to:

 17472 Dinah, a main-belt asteroid
 Club Skirts Dinah Shore Weekend, called "the Dinah", a U.S. lesbian music festival
Dinah, a 1923 revue by Irvin Miller
 "Dinah" (song), a song published in 1925
Dinah (film), a 1933 film featuring the Mills Brothers
 Dinah! (album), a 1956 music album by Dinah Washington
 "Someone's in the Kitchen with Dinah", a 19th-century song attributed to J. H. Cave
 Dinah!, a 1970s daytime talk show hosted by Dinah Shore
 Dinah (given name), a feminine given name
 Dinah Washington Park, a Chicago community
 Dinah the Dachshund, a fictional Disney character 
 Dinah the Dining Car, a character in Starlight Express
 Mitsubishi Ki-46, airplane

See also 
 Deena
 Dena (disambiguation)
 Dina (disambiguation)